Lucena, officially the City of Lucena, is a 1st class highly urbanized city in the Calabarzon region of the Philippines. It is the capital city of the province of Quezon where it is geographically situated but, in terms of government and administration, the city is politically independent from the province. For statistical and geographical purposes, Lucena is grouped with the province of Quezon. According to the 2020 census, it has a population of 278,924 people.

History

Early history
In the 1570s, Captain Juan de Salcedo first explored what was then Kalilayan, later founded as a province in 1591. The Franciscan priests Juan de Plasencia and Diego de Oropesa between 1580 and 1583 founded its town, also named Tayabas. Tayabas was organized by the Spaniards through the Franciscan missionaries and Lucena was just one of its barrios. Tayabas became the provincial capital in 1749, renaming the province after it.

The Spaniards of the 16th century called the area "Buenavista" because of its scenic beauty; several years later, the barrio was renamed "Oroquieta". A century later, Muslim pirates began terrorizing the entire Philippine coastline, and Oroquieta was not spared from the notorious raids. The barrio folks built forts along the seashores to defend it against the attacking pirates along the coast, particularly in the present-day Cotta and in Barangay Mayao, though these structures are no longer extant. Hence, the place became known as Cotta, the Spanish form of the Tagalog "kuta" ("fort"). The growth of local maritime trade facilitated in the Cotta port and the final defeat of Moro pirates plying the Luzon and Visayan waters, afforded the growth of Lucena as a town which eventually led to its being the provincial capital of Tayabas in 1901.

Finally on November 3, 1879, A royal decree was issued and the Orden Superior Civil officially adopted the name "Lucena" in honor of a Spanish friar by the name of Father Mariano Granja in Andalucia, Spain. Fr. Granja was responsible for the development of the barrio that became a Parish in 1881. Lucena became an independent municipality on June 1, 1882.

During the 1896 Philippine Revolution, the people of Lucena showed their brand of patriotism. José Zaballero led the local revolutionists who were under the barrage of Spanish muskets. Later, Miguel Arguilles with Jose Barcelona as president formed a revolutionary government in Lucena.

After Aguinaldo proclaimed the nation's independence on June 12, 1898, in Kawit, Cavite, Gen. Miguel Malvar, as Commanding General for Southern Luzon, took over Tayabas Province on August 15, 1898. Don Crisanto Marquez became Lucena's first elected Municipal president during the first Philippine Republic.

Filipino-American War

Lucena's fertile soil became soaked with the blood of many Filipinos and Americans at the outbreak of the Filipino-American War in 1899. The foreigners established a civil government in the country, and on March 12, 1901, the provincial capital was transferred from Tayabas to Lucena.

World War II 
On December 27, 1941, the Japanese Imperial Forces overran the city of Lucena (referred to by the locals as The Fall of Lucena), just 19 days after they set foot on Philippine soil. The Japanese wanted to strengthen their military presence in the region, sending units to capture key points in the town. The invasion was initially successful however the Japanese Imperial Forces would soon encounter stiff resistance from members of the local resistance and members of the Hunters ROTC.

The underground resistance movement was tenacious. Japanese Forces would be caught off-guard with surprise assaults which often resulted in fierce close-quarters combat. Constant assaults and logistical issues would take its toll on the Japanese forces.

By January 25, 1945, the Hunters ROTC guerrillas had penetrated into the town. Using their knowledge of the local surroundings to their advantage, they moved quickly in order prevent Japanese forces from organizing a proper defense. After a hard-fought offensive, the Filipino forces had successfully driven the Japanese out of Lucena. The people of Lucena would fortify their defenses in preparation for another assault. Attempts by the Japanese to re-establish their occupation of Lucena failed.

Tayabas province stood by and waited for the American Liberation forces and the Philippine Commonwealth troops, who would soon hand them their freedom on April 4, 1945.

Cityhood

Lucena was made into a chartered city through the efforts of then-Congressman Manuel S. Enverga of Quezon's 1st district. Republic Act No. 3271 lapsed into law on June 17, 1961, without the signature of then-President Carlos P. Garcia. The induction of its city officials led by then-Mayor Castro Profugo, as well as its formal inauguration took place on August 20, 1961, as formally stated on Section 90 of Republic Act No. 3271. On July 1, 1991, Lucena became a highly urbanized city, thereby making the city independent from the province.

Geography

The city proper is wedged between two rivers, Dumacaa River on the east and Iyam River on the west. Seven other rivers and six creeks serve as natural drainage for the city. Its port on the coast along Tayabas Bay is home to several boat and ferry lines operating and serving the sea lanes between Lucena and the different points in the region and as far as the Visayas.

Light aircraft can no longer make use of it as a road was built as an intersection during the presidency of Gloria Macapagal Arroyo.

Being the provincial capital, Lucena is host to most of the branches of governmental agencies, businesses, banks and service facilities in the Southern Tagalog region.

Barangays
Lucena is politically subdivided into 33 barangays.

Climate

Lucena falls under Type III of the Corona's climatic classification system. It is characterized by no pronounced wet and dry seasons. Generally, the wet season is from June to November and sometimes extends up to December when the southwest monsoon is predominant. The dry season is from January to May but is sometimes interrupted by erratic rainfall. Habagat monsoon winds pass through the province from June to October while northeasterly winds or Amihan blows through the islands from December to February.

Demographics

Economy

Retail and commerce

Economic activities in Lucena are heavily concentrated in the poblacion (bayan) and other suburban barangays where the highly dense and constricted central business district (CBD) is home to a large cluster of different business enterprises. As population grows in tandem with new and promising business prospects, business activities spill over adjoining barangays, thus forming mini satellite commercial areas.

Other commercial strips are located in the poblacion and suburban barangays where both retail and wholesale trade, including other essential services, are being engaged in. Lucena City features SM City Lucena, the biggest mall in the city located in Ibabang Dupay, which is also one of the first SM Malls in Luzon. Other Shopping Centers Include: Pacific Mall Lucena (Metro Gaisano Mall),  SM Savemore Agora, Puregold Gulang-Gulang Lucena and many more.

Industries
Big factories and warehouses are present in these suburban barangays like San Miguel Brewery, Coca-Cola Bottlers Philippines, Inc., PepsiCo Philippines, Inc., Asia Brewery, Inc. Nestlé Philippines, and Ginebra San Miguel, Inc. (formerly La Tondeña Distillers Inc.), do business in sales, distribution, and transport of assorted business products in bulk.

Of the total  land area of Lucena City, 19 percent or  cover the existing built up area. Almost 3% of this or  cover the industrial section, located in different barangays of the city. These areas are home to significant industrial and manufacturing activities.

Industry in Lucena produces a sustainable amount of agro-industrial-based products, dried and smoked fish, distilled liquors, bamboo and rattan furniture, ornamental flowers/plants, vegetable as well as meat products.

Lucena is also known as the "Cocopalm City of the South". Nestled midst a wide expanse of coconut lands, Lucena has coconut oil mills which produce oil-based household products like cooking oil, soap, lard, margarine, and oil-based medicines. Exora Cooking Oil and Vegetable Lard, and Miyami Cooking Oil are proudly made in this city. Tantuco Industries, JnJ Oil Industries, Inc., and Monaco Oil Company are some of the well-known coconut oil companies in the city.

Car assembly and manufacturing plants have also established in the city, while Manila-based car shops are starting to put up some branches like Toyota-Lucena, Isuzu-Lucena, SFM-Lucena, and Foton Motor.

San Pedro Shipping Yard (Subsidiary of MSLI) is also located in Dalahican.

Places of interest

Road network provides access from all key cities and towns in the island of Luzon to this highly urbanized city. Well-paved radial and by-pass routes criss-crossing in and out of the city facilitate the transport of unlimited assortment of merchandise, supplies, and raw materials to and from the city on a round-the-clock basis.

Over the years, it was observed that a growing number of visitors from other places come to Lucena. Travelers of various types and sizes are drawn to Lucena because of modern facilities and good amenities that could be found in the city such as the Quezon Convention Center when the City of Lucena hosted the 2004 SEABA Under-18 Championship qualifying tournament for the 2004 FIBA Asia Under-18 Championship in India, Kalilayan Civic Centre, Sentro Pastoral Auditorium, Alcala Sports Complex a two time host of a Palarong Pambansa (1976, 1989), Manuel S. Enverga University Foundation Gymnasium, Sacred Heart College Gymnasium, and Marcial Punzalan Gymnasium.

Religious landmarks

Saint Ferdinand Cathedral, Barangay V
Saint Jude Thaddeus Parish Church, Barangay Cotta
Carmel of Saint Joseph Monastery, Barangay XI
Our Lady of Lourdes Parish Church, Barangay Ibabang Iyam
Our Lady of Peñafrancia Parish Church Diocesan Shrine, Hermanas Capistrano Subdivision, Barangay Gulang-Gulang
St. Alphonsus Regional Seminary, Barangay Isabang
St. Andrew The Apostle Chapel, Camp Guillermo Nakar, Barangay Gulang-Gulang
Church of the Holy Face of Jesus, University Village (Site), Barangay Ibabang Dupay
St. Raphael The Archangel Parish, Barangay Dalahican
St. Isidore Labrador, Barangay Ibabang Dupay
Holy Family Church, Centro Pastoral Compound, Barangay Isabang
Our Lady Of Miraculous Medal Chapel, Barangay IX

Natural attractions
Botanical Garden
Orchids Country Farm
Perez Park
Eco Park

Festivals

Pasayahan sa Lucena was conceptualized to showcase the natural and ecological interrelationship and independence between nature and man. It also promotes the ways of life inherent among the people of Lucena. All these find exquisite and appreciative expressions through a mammoth gathering of colors, outlandish costumes and symbolic floats reminiscent of Mardi Gras in Rio de Janeiro and New Orleans. Originally intended as three days of spirited merrymaking in the streets, the event has become weeklong tourist attraction, culminating on May 30 in time for the celebration of the Feast of St. Ferdinand, the patron saint of Lucena.

Another feast highlighting the entire celebration is the Chami Festival that would feature Lucena's very own pansit delicacy. The traditional Chami Festival has a contest of who can cook the most delicious chami. The contestants line up along Quezon Avenue, the city's main road, armed with their cooking utensils and will be provided free chami noodles, meat and other condiments for the cooking fest. All participants were also given cash incentive, gift packs from various sponsors. After the cooking, the spectators were given a chance to eat for free the different taste of chami. They wanted that through this chami cooking festival this city will become a destination of our local and foreign tourists every merry month of May.

Government

Pursuant to Chapter II, Title II, Book III of Republic Act No. 7160 or the Local Government Code of 1991, the city government is to be composed of a mayor (alkalde), a vice mayor (bise alkalde) and members (kagawad) of the legislative branch Sangguniang Panlungsod alongside a secretary to the said legislature, all of which are elected to a three-year term and are eligible to run for three consecutive terms.

Elected officials

List of former chief executives
Head of the Municipality during the Spanish Occupation:
Jorge Zaballero (1896) (Captain Municipal)
Crisanto Márquez (First Municipal President of Lucena)

Municipal Presidents during the American Civil Government:
Gabriel Cord (1902–1903)
Gregorio Márquez (1903–1904)
Juan Carmona (1904–1906)
Venancio Queblar (1906–1910)
Feliciano Zoleta (1910–1912)
Fortunato Álvarez (1912–1916)
Pedro Nieva (1916–1919, 1919–1922)
José Nava (1922–1925)
Venancio Queblar (1925–1928)
Domingo Gamboa (1928–1931)
Fernando Barcelona (1931–1934)

Mayors under the Commonwealth Government:
Federico V. Márquez (1940–1943)
José Mendoza (1943–1944)
Teotimo Atienza (1944–1945)

Acting Mayors (After World War II):
Julian Zoleta (April 1945)
Federico Márquez (May 1945)
Honorio Abadilla (October 1946)

Elected Mayors:
Amando Zaballero (1947–1952)
Honorio Abadilla (1952–1955)
Casto T. Profugo (1955–1960, 1961–1963)
Mario L. Tagarao (1963–1967, 1967–1971, 1971–1981,1981–1986)
Euclides Abcede (May 1986 – November 1987) (appointed)
Romeo Mendoza (December 4–7, 1987) (appointed)
Julio T. Alzona (December 8, 1987 – February 7, 1988) (appointed)
Cesar Zaballero (February 8, 1988 – June 1992)
Ramon Y. Talaga, Jr. (1992–1995, 1995–1998)
Bernard G. Tagarao (1998 – May 12, 2000)
Ramon Y. Talaga, Jr. (May 13, 2000 – June 30, 2010)
Barbara "Ruby" C. Talaga (2010 – October 2012) 
Roderick "Dondon" A. Alcala (November 2012 – 2022)
Mark Don Victor B. Alcala (2022–Present)

Notes

Infrastructure

Transportation

Lucena City has a central transportation hub called the Lucena Grand Central Terminal located in Barangay Ilayang Dupay, just midway through the Bicol Region and back. The Lucena Grand Central Terminal also hosts the Lucena City Land Transportation Office (LTO) where aspiring drivers can get their driver's license and where drivers can get their license renewed. New and modern buses ply the route Buendia/LRT1-Lucena, EDSA Pasay-Lucena, Cubao/Kamias-Lucena and Alabang/Starmall-Lucena or UV Express Van to Taytay, Rizal Via Antipolo, Manila East Road, Pililla Wind Farm and Laguna East, Lucban, Tayabas. It serves not only Manila-bound buses but also buses going toward the upland and far-flung areas of Quezon province, particularly Bondoc Peninsula towns. Bus companies such as JAC Liner, Lucena Lines, JAM Liner, DLTBCo and N. Dela Rosa Bus Lines bring passengers to Manila and Lucena back and forth. Lucena also has a wide network of jeepney routes, all emanating from the city proper (Bayan) and reaching out to the major barangays of the city, as well as nearby towns. Thousand of tricycles also roam the streets of the city, bringing passengers right at their point of destination. These tricycles usually are the mode of transport when night falls. The South Luzon Expressway (SLEX) Toll Road 4 (TR-4) Extension from Santo Tomas, Batangas will end in Lucena City at the connection of Maharlika Highway at Barangay Mayao. It is supposed to be finished by 2019 but moved to 2022.

Furthermore, taxis as mode of transportation are available servicing passengers in this city.

There is an expressway project to Bicol planned to extend the South Luzon Expressway to Matnog, Sorsogon as SLEX Toll Road 5.

There exists a Lucena Airport, but no commercial flights come to the city. Even light aircraft can not make use of the facilities.

The Philippine National Railways (PNR) is on the process of rehabilitating the existing Manila-Bicol and Baguio-Bicol Railway Line, which includes stops in Quezon province, including PNR Lucena station, which traditionally then is a major loading & pick-up point for passengers and cargoes alike when the railway system was once the primary transportation mode going to Manila. Modern air-conditioned coaches will ply this route.

Despite undergoing renovation, PNR Lucena station is still active servicing passengers to and from San Pablo City daily.

The Passenger Ferry Terminal in Lucena has RORO vessels that transport passengers across Tayabas Bay to Marinduque, Romblon and Masbate.
The port complex is built along the fishing village of Barangay Talao-Talao, a kilometer away to the east of Dalahican Fishing Port. Operational area of 576.00 square meters and commercial area of 4,598.75 square meters as delineated under Executive order No. 199 dated September 20, 1994, signed by then President Fidel V. Ramos. The port is accessible via the paved provincial road connecting the Dalahican Road and a rough causeway leading to the port. It is 27 nautical miles to Dalahican, and 57 nautical miles to Batangas City and sea distance to Manila is 150 nautical miles. Passenger ferry services include Montenegro Shipping Lines and Star Horse Shipping Lines.

Communication
Lucena City is served by landline and mobile phone companies like the Philippine Long Distance Telephone Company (PLDT) and Digitel Telecommunications (PLDT-Digitel). Major mobile phone providers in the area include Globe, Smart, DITO Telecommunity, Sun Cellular, and Asian Vision. Wi-Fi providers like Converge ICT also operate within the city.

Hospitals

Lucena has private and public hospitals that are capable of providing most common and advanced medical services, as well as in handling medical emergencies. Both types of institutions are considered to provide the same standard of healthcare and services, differing mainly with the medical and diagnostic facilities at hand.

These are staffed with qualified medical practitioners that are well-versed in English. The doctors are graduates of the many top reputable medical schools in the Philippines; most have pursued further studies and training in the United States. Likewise, the nurses are the products of the many credible nursing schools in the country. These same institutions have produced the many Filipino nurses working in the United States, Europe, Middle East, and other parts of the world.

Education

In 2006, the city had a literacy rate of 98.6 percent. Lucena City has numerous tertiary and secondary schools, including public and private. The tertiary education system in Lucena provides instruction and training in fields of study, both for baccalaureate degrees and vocational courses. Institutions offering degree programs including Liberal Arts, Arts and Sciences, Engineering, and Information Technology include the Lucena Campus of Southern Luzon State University, STI College Lucena along Quezon Avenue cor. Don Perez St., ABE International College of Business and Economics along Quezon Avenue, Philtech Institute of Arts and Technology Inc. (PIAT), Manuel S. Enverga University Foundation, City College of Lucena along the Maharlika Highway, Columbus College-Lucena, AMA Computer College-Lucena, Sacred Heart College (Lucena) (the oldest Catholic school in Quezon Province), the International School of Better Beginnings (ISBB), Calayan Educational Foundation, Inc., and Maryhill College. Aside from tertiary schools, the city also has an expanse footprint on the pre-school, primary and secondary levels of education, both in public and private schools such as the Infant Jesus Montessori Center Philippines (IJMCP), Saint Philomena School, International School for Better Beginnings (ISBB), and the Holy Rosary Catholic School. There are numerous day-care centers found all over the city.

Notable personalities

Encarnacion Alzona, historian, National Scientist of the Philippines, chairwoman of the National Historical Commission from 1966 to 1967, and the first Filipino woman to receive a Ph.D.
Nilo Alcala, composer, 2019 The American Prize Winner in Composition. First Philippine-born composer to be commissioned by Grammy-winner Los Angeles Master Chorale, and also to receive the Aaron Copland House Residency Award; Natatanging Lucenahin 2021.
Proceso J. Alcala, 12th Secretary of the Department of Agriculture and graduate of Luzonian University Foundation (now MSEUF)
Fides Cuyugan-Asensio, National Artist of the Philippines for Music
Jessie Dellosa, 43rd AFP Chief of Staff and graduate of Quezon National High School.
Jenny Miller, Filipina actress and graduate of Manuel S. Enverga University Foundation
Mau Marcelo, first winner of Philippine Idol talent search in 2006 and graduate of Manuel S. Enverga University Foundation
Neil Ryan Sese, film and theatre actor at GMA Network
Paz Márquez-Benítez, Filipina short-story writer and graduate of Quezon National High School
Rita Gaviola, viral 'Badjao' girl and former Pinoy Big Brother: Lucky 7 housemate
Mitch Talao, transgender mother and former Pinoy Big Brother: Otso housemate
Joseph Morong, reporter and news anchor at GMA Network, part of the Malacañang Press Corps
PBGEN Rhoderick C. Armamento, acting director, Philippine National Police Academy/PNPA, former deputy director of CIDG, he was also the previous Quezon Police Provincial Office Director
Anjo Alimario, Senior reporter and news anchor at CNN Philippines, part of the Judiciary Beat
Eian Rances, former Pinoy Big Brother: Kumunity Season 10 Celebrity housemate, Kumu Streamer and PIE Channel Jock

Sister cities
 Tayabas City, Philippines
 General Santos, Philippines
 Calabanga, Camarines Sur, Philippines

References

External links

 [ Philippine Standard Geographic Code]
Philippine Census Information

 
Cities in Quezon
Highly urbanized cities in the Philippines
Port cities and towns in the Philippines
Provincial capitals of the Philippines
Populated places established in 1882
1882 establishments in the Philippines